Diplopseustis is a genus of snout moths in the subfamily Lathrotelinae of the family Crambidae. It was described in 1884 by Edward Meyrick with Cymoriza minima Butler, 1881 as its type species, which is now considered a synonym of Diplopseustis perieresalis.

The genus currently comprises seven species distributed in the Afrotropical, Indomalayan and Australasian realm.

Species
Diplopseustis constellata Warren, 1896
Diplopseustis metallias Meyrick, 1897
Diplopseustis nigerialis Hampson, 1906
Diplopseustis pallidalis Warren, 1896
Diplopseustis perieresalis (Walker, 1859)
Diplopseustis prophetica Meyrick, 1887
Diplopseustis selenalis Hampson, 1906

References

Crambidae
Taxa named by Edward Meyrick